The name Ruby has been used for 14 tropical cyclones worldwide.

Western Pacific:
Typhoon Ruby (1950) (T5037)
Typhoon Ruby (1954) (T5420)
Tropical Storm Ruby (1959) (T5901, 02W)
Tropical Storm Ruby (1961) (T6121, 53W)
Typhoon Ruby (1964) (T6417, 25W, Yoning) – struck near Hong Kong
Tropical Storm Ruby (1967) (T6701, 01W, Auring)
Tropical Storm Ruby (1970) (T7004, 04W, Emang)
Typhoon Ruby (1972) (T7228, 30W) – not a threat to land
Typhoon Ruby (1976) (T7607, 07W, Huaning) – struck the Philippines and approached Japan
Typhoon Ruby (1982) (T8205, 05W)
Tropical Storm Ruby (1985) (T8514, 14W) – struck Japan
Typhoon Ruby (1988) (T8828, 23W, Unsang) – affected the Philippines and Hainan Island
Typhoon Hagupit (2014) (T1422, 22W, Ruby) – struck the Philippines

Australian Region:
Cyclone Ruby (2021)

Pacific typhoon set index articles
Pacific hurricane set index articles